Station Park is a transit-oriented development located in Farmington, Utah, United States. It borders the Farmington FrontRunner station. Centercal Properties developed and currently maintains Station Park. Amenities include approximately 100 stores, a fountain that is synchronized to music and lights, an ice skating rink, a Hyatt Place hotel and a Cinemark theatre.

History
Haws Companies began to buy land for Station Park in 1996. Then they worked with Farmington city from 2000-2006 to develop the land before selling it to CenterCal properties in 2007. Development of Station Park began in 2008. Station Park opened in 2011.

In 2013 Haws Companies filed a lawsuit against Farmington city citing discrimination against Haws Companies and failure to follow through on previous agreements. In 2014 Haws Companies dropped the suit against Farmington city.

Anchors and major stores
Apple Store
Barnes & Noble
Best Buy
Cabela's
Cinemark Theatres
Cost Plus World Market
Forever 21
H&M
Harmons
Marshalls
Nike Factory Store
Nordstrom Rack
Old Navy
REI
Ross Dress For Less

Former anchors
Gordmans - now Best Buy as of October 2018.
Sports Authority - now REI and Nike Factory Store as of October 2020.

References

External links

Transit-oriented developments in the United States
Shopping malls in Utah
Buildings and structures in Farmington, Utah